Harare Central Hospital also known as Harare Hospital/Gomo Hospital is the second largest government central hospital in Zimbabwe after Parirenyatwa Hospital.
The hospital is the main referral center for patients and casualties from the Northern half of Zimbabwe and is also the main services hospital for greater Harare residents.

Harare Hospital was officially opened on 2 May 1958 by the then Governor General of the Federation of Rhodesia and Nyasaland, Lord Dalhousie.

The hospital has been the main teaching hospital for the University of Zimbabwe's Faculty of Medicine's practical lectures since 1966 and has full accreditation by the College of Surgeons for East-Central and Southern Africa status for the training of surgeons. The hospital is also a training hospital for nurses, theatre nurses, pediatric nurses, midwives, radiographers,laboratory technicians and pharmacy technicians.

Main wards
General ward
Martenity ward/Harare Maternity Hospital/Pediatric Health Care facility
Children's Ward/Harare Children's Hospital
Psychiatric ward/Harare Central Psychiatric Unit

References

Medical education in Zimbabwe
Teaching hospitals
Hospitals in Zimbabwe